The Mann's Creek Railroad was a  narrow gauge railroad that operated during the nineteenth- and twentieth-centuries in Fayette County, West Virginia, United States.

History
The Mann's Creek Railroad was constructed in 1886 to haul coal and lumber for the Babcock Coal and Coke Company, which owned and operated the line.

Due to the area's rugged terrain, construction of the line required numerous retaining walls and demolition of numerous cliffs. At Clifftop were the Babcock Coal and Coke Company's coal mines, which the railroad served by hauling coal down to 193 beehive coke ovens along the C&O mainline at Sewell.

References

Defunct West Virginia railroads
Railway companies established in 1886
Railway companies disestablished in 1955
3 ft gauge railways in the United States
Narrow gauge railroads in West Virginia